USS Bluebird (AMS/MSC-121) was a  acquired by the US Navy for clearing minefields in coastal waterways.

Construction
The third Bluebird to be so named by the Navy, AMS-121 was laid down on 5 February 1952, at Vallejo, California, by the Mare Island Naval Shipyard; launched on 11 May 1953; sponsored by Mrs. G. C. Demmon; and commissioned on 24 July 1953.

West Coast operations 
The minesweeper operated out of San Diego, California, performing the usual tasks such as type training and fleet exercises. She also engaged in some experimental work.

Transfer to the East Coast 
On 5 May 1954, however, Bluebird stood out of San Diego bound for Charleston, South Carolina. She transited the Panama Canal on 19 May, and after a visit to Guantanamo Bay, Cuba, arrived in her new home port on 27 May. The minesweeper conducted normal training operations out of Charleston and in Chesapeake Bay for about a year.

Reclassified coastal minesweeper 
On 7 February 1955, Bluebird was reclassified a coastal minesweeper and redesignated MSC-121. During the summer and fall of 1955, she participated in two Bureau of Ships projects. The first tested the effects of underwater explosions on minesweeper hulls and equipment. The second consisted of an overall evaluation of the Bluebird-class minesweeper. Later that fall, she joined in LantPhibEx 1-55 off Onslow Beach, North Carolina. Early in 1956, she was based at Yorktown, Virginia, but soon thereafter returned to her old home port, Charleston.

Participation in NATO exercises 
Charleston remained her home port for more than 12 years. In addition to the usual single-ship drills and type training, the minesweeper participated in such exercises as the annual NATO "Sweep Clear" exercises and Atlantic Fleet amphibious exercises. She tested minesweeping gear for the Mine Defense Laboratory at Panama City, Florida, and served as a school ship for the Mine Warfare School.

Earning the Armed Forces Expeditionary Medal 
In January 1961, Bluebird began making regular periodic deployments to the West Indies serving under the auspices of the Commander, Fleet Training Group, Guantanamo Bay. It was on one of those deployments that, during the summer of 1965, she earned the Armed Forces Expeditionary Medal for her role in the American intervention to restore order in the volatile Dominican Republic.

Home-based out of Florida 
Those and similar operations continued to occupy her time until September 1968. On 5 September, she received orders changing her home port to Ft. Lauderdale, Florida. Bluebird departed Charleston that same day and reached her destination on 7 September. Two days later, she was placed out of commission, in service.

Reassigned as a training ship 
The minesweeper was assigned duty training naval reservists at Ft. Lauderdale. That service lasted until mid-May 1971, when she returned to Charleston to begin preparations for inactivation.

Decommissioning 
Bluebird was placed out of commission, in reserve, on 1 July 1971. That December, she was taken to Norfolk where she joined the Atlantic Reserve Fleet. On 2 January 1975, her name was struck from the Navy list. She was sold for scrap to Oskco Edwards, Capistrano, California, in September 1979. The details of her ultimate disposition are unknown.

Notes 

Citations

Bibliography 

Online resources

External links 

 

 

Adjutant-class minesweepers
Bluebird-class minesweepers
Ships built in Vallejo, California
1953 ships